Donald Barrell (born 3 February 1986 in Watford) is a rugby union player for the Bedford Blues in the Aviva Championship. He formerly played for Saracens in the Aviva Premiership. Barrell's position of choice is at Flanker or No. 8.

Career
Barrell attended Watford Grammar School for Boys and played for his school team. He went on to study Anthropology at University College London.

Barrell made his club debut aged 18 in the 2003–04 Zurich Premiership against the Northampton Saints. Barrell represented the England U19's at the 2005 U19 IRB World Championship. He was a part of the wider England Sevens squad in the 2006-07 IRB Sevens World Series.

References

External links
Saracens profile
Guinness Premiership profile
RFU England Sevens Profile

1986 births
Living people
Alumni of University College London
English rugby union players
Male rugby sevens players
People educated at Watford Grammar School for Boys
Rugby union players from Watford
Saracens F.C. players